The Union Transfer and Storage Building is a building in Houston, Texas, in the United States. Constructed in 1917, it was added to the National Register of Historic Places on January 16, 2001.

See also
 National Register of Historic Places listings in Harris County, Texas

References

1917 establishments in Texas
Buildings and structures completed in 1917
National Register of Historic Places in Houston
Commercial buildings on the National Register of Historic Places in Texas
Warehouses on the National Register of Historic Places